Rameh-ye Bala (also Romanized as Rāmeh-ye Bālā and Rāmeh Bālā) is a village in Faravan Rural District, Kohanabad District, Aradan County, Semnan Province, Iran. At the 2006 census, its population was 36, in 9 families.

References 

Populated places in Aradan County